Sever Coracu (born 2 October 1920, date of death unknown) was a Romanian football striker and a sprinter. He was national champion at 200 metres sprint in 1939.

International career
Sever Coracu made his debut at international level for Romania in a 2–1 away victory against Yugoslavia, he also appeared in a 1–0 loss against Albania, at the 1946 Balkan Cup.

Honours
Universitatea Cluj
Cupa României runner-up: 1941–42, 1948–49

Notes

References

External links
Sever Coracu at Labtof.ro

1920 births
Year of death missing
Romanian footballers
Romania international footballers
Association football forwards
Liga I players
Liga II players
FC Ripensia Timișoara players
FC Universitatea Cluj players
CFR Cluj players
Romanian male sprinters
People from Kovin
Immigrants to Romania